Beverley Joan Randell Price  (born 1931), known by the pen name Beverley Randell, is a New Zealand children's author, whose work has been published by 16 publishers in several languages. Born in Wellington, she studied English and History at Victoria University College before becoming a teacher. In 1955 her first story, John the Mouse who Learned to Read, was published, and has sold around 267,000 copies.

Over the years Randell has written hundreds of books, many aimed at children with limited reading skills, but also books aimed at adults. She married Hugh Price, a publisher, in 1955. To date, over two million copies of her books have been sold.

In the 2004 Queen's Birthday Honours, Randell was appointed a Member of the New Zealand Order of Merit, for services to children's literature and education.

Honours
  Member of the New Zealand Order of Merit (New Zealand) 2004
  Chevalier de la Ordre national du Mérite (France) 2005

Works
Some of Randell's books include:
Wellington At Work In The 1890s, (Hugh Price joint author) 2009, New Zealand, Steele Roberts 
Baby Bear Goes Fishing, (Isabel Lowe ill.) 1994, New Zealand, Nelson Price Milburn 
Baby Hippo, (Elizabeth Russell-Arnot ill.) 1994, New Zealand, Nelson Price Milburn 
Sally's Beans, (Meredith Thomas ill.) 1994, New Zealand, Nelson Price Milburn 
Tabby In The Tree, (Julian Bruere ill.) 1994, New Zealand, Nelson Price Milburn 
Father Bear Goes Fishing, (Isabel Lowe ill.) 1993, New Zealand, Price Milburn 
The Lion and the Mouse (adapted by Randell), (Clare Bowes ill.) 1976, England, Methuen Educational 
The Hungry Kitten, (Judith Trevelyan ill.) 1974, England, Methuen Educational 
Baby Lamb's First Drink, (Ernest Papps ill.) 1973, New Zealand, Price Milburn 
Lizard Loses His Tail, (Judith Trevelyan ill.) 1973, New Zealand, Price Milburn 
John, The Mouse Who Learned to Read, (Noela Young, ill.) 1969, England, Collins

References

External links

National Library of New Zealand catalogue entry for Randell

1931 births
New Zealand children's writers
New Zealand women children's writers
People educated at Wellington Girls' College
People from Wellington City
Living people
Members of the New Zealand Order of Merit
Victoria University of Wellington alumni